Jaumea carnosa, known by the common names marsh jaumea, fleshy jaumea, or simply jaumea, is a halophytic salt marsh plant native to the wetlands, coastal sea cliffs and salt marshes of the western coast of North America.

Description
It is a perennial dicotyledon. It has succulent green leaves on soft pinkish-green stems, not unlike ice plant in appearance. Its stems are weak and long. Flowers are yellow and the peduncle is enlarged below the head. It spreads by an extensive rhizome system.

Distribution
Jaumea carnosa ranges from British Columbia to northern Baja California, and can be found in wetlands and salt marshes. Some populations are located on the Channel Islands of California.

References

External links
Jepson Manual Treatment, University of California
United States Department of Agriculture Plants Profile
Calflora photo gallery, University of California
Washington State University, intertidal organisms,  Jaumea carnosa (Marsh jaumea) photo and commentary
Paul Slichter, Members of the Sunflower Family Found West of the Cascade Mountains With Flower Heads Consisting of Both Disc and Ray Flowers,  Fleshy Jaumea, Marsh Jaumea Jaumea carnosa photos

Tageteae
Flora of California
Flora of Washington (state)
Flora of Oregon
Flora of British Columbia
Flora of Baja California
Plants described in 1831
Halophytes
Salt marsh plants
Flora without expected TNC conservation status